Our Lady of the Lake Catholic Academy (O.L.L.) is a high school in Keswick, Ontario, Canada in the York Catholic District School Board.

The high school's philosophy and unique inclusion of grades 7 and 8 were cited by Principal Mike Nasello in a Toronto Sun interview explaining the school's jump from a 4.8 to a 7.9 rating in the Fraser Institute's rating between 2002 and 2007. Over 90% of first-time writers of the province's literary test passed in 2007 compared with 67.1% in 2002.

Notable alumni
Sean Walker, (2012) professional ice hockey player

See also
List of high schools in Ontario

References

External links 
 Ministry of Education school information
 Our Lady of the Lake's website

York Catholic District School Board
High schools in the Regional Municipality of York
Catholic secondary schools in Ontario
Educational institutions established in 2001
2001 establishments in Ontario